Juan León (1919 – 1992) was a Cuban outfielder in the Negro leagues in the 1940s.

A native of Gibara, Cuba, León played for the New York Cubans in 1948. In 13 recorded games, he posted 19 hits and eight RBI in 57 plate appearances.

References

External links
 and Seamheads

Date of birth missing
Date of death missing
Place of death missing
New York Cubans players
Baseball outfielders
Cuban baseball players
People from Holguín Province
1919 births